Chinka may refer to:

 Chinka, a mythological figure in Laz, Mingrelian and Georgian mythology
 Chinka, Greece, a village in Ioannina, Greece
 Chinka, a village in Kardzhali Province, Bulgaria, made up of Malka Chinka and Golyama Chinka

See also 
 CHINCA, China International Contractors Association
 Shinca (disambiguation)